Stacy Blake-Beard has a BS in Psychology from the University of Maryland, an MA and a Ph.D. in organizational psychology from the University of Michigan. Since 2002, Blake-Beard has been teaching organizational behavior at the Simmons College School of Management and is currently a tenured Professor of Management. Before Blake-Beard joined Simmons, she was Assistant Professor of Administration, Planning, and Social Policy at the Harvard University Graduate School of Education. At HGSE she lectured on organizational behavior, cultural diversity in organizations, and mentoring relationships at work.

In her research work, Blake-Beard examines mentoring relationships in the context of gender and workforce diversity. Her research has been published in the Journal of Career Development, the Academy of Management Executive, the Psychology of Women Quarterly, Journal of Management Development, the Journal of Business Ethics, Human Resource Management Journal and The Diversity Factor. Blake-Beard’s focus is also on the dynamics of formal mentoring programs in the corporate environment, team building, gender and leadership.

For her project “Systems of Sustenance and Support: Exploring the Impact of Mentoring on the Career Experiences of Indian Women” pursued in cooperation with the Center for Leadership, Innovation and Change at the Indian School of Business in Hyderabad, Blake-Beard was granted a 2010-2011 Fulbright Award. Blake-Beard consults on formal mentoring programs implementation, action planning and team building for several organizations, among others: Chase Manhattan Bank, Hewlett Packard, IBM, Cisco, PepsiCo.  Blake-Beard sits on the advisory board of a number of organizations, including MentorNet, Teen Voices, the Harvard Project on Tenure, the Harvard Medical School Center for the Study of Diversity in Science, and Jobs for the Future.

Selected publications
Wasserman, I. & Blake-Beard, S. (2010). “Leading inclusively: Mind-sets, skills and actions for a diverse, complex world.”  In K.A. Bunker, D.T. Hall, & K.E. Kram (Eds.), Extraordinary leadership: Addressing the gaps in senior executive development (pp. 197–212).  San Francisco, CA: Jossey-Bass.
Shapiro, M., Ingols, C., Blake-Beard, S. & O’Neill, R.  (2009). “Canaries in the mine shaft: Women signaling a new career model.”  People & Strategy, 32(3), 52-59.
Blake-Beard, S.D. (2009).  “Mentoring as a bridge to understanding cultural differences.”  Adult Learning, 20(1&2), 14-18.
Fletcher, J., Bailyn, L. & Blake-Beard, S.  (2009). “Practical pushing: Creating discursive space in organizational narratives.”  In J.W. Cox, T. LeTrent-Jones, D. Weir, & M. Voronov (Eds.), Critical management studies at work: Multidisciplinary approaches to negotiating tensions between theory and practice (pp. 82–93).  St. Louis, MO: Elsevior.
Hunt, L., LaRoche, G., Blake-Beard, S., Chin, E., Arroyave, M., & Scully, M. (2009).  “Cross-cultural connections: Leveraging social networks for women’s advancement.”  In M. Barreto, M.K. Ryan & M.T. Schmitt (Eds), The glass ceiling in the 21st century:  Understanding barriers to gender equality.  Washington, DC: American Psychological Association.
Shapiro, M., Ingols, C. & Blake-Beard, S. (2008).  “Confronting career double-binds: Implications for women and organizations.”  Journal of Career Development, 34(3), 309-333.
Bearman, S., Blake-Beard, S.D., Hunt, L. & Crosby, F.J.   (2007). "Future mentoring research: Cutting across mentoring themes and contexts."  In T.D. Allen & L.T. Eby (Eds), Blackwell handbook of mentoring: A multiple perspectives approach. Malden, MA: Blackwell Publishing.
Scully, M.A. & Blake-Beard, S.D. (2006). “Locating class in organizational diversity work: Class as structure, style and process.” In P. Prasad, A. Konrad & J. Pringle (Eds), Handbook of Workplace Diversity. Thousand Oaks, CA: Sage.
Blake-Beard, S.D., Murrell, A.J. & Thomas, D.A.  (2007). “Unfinished business: The impact of race on understanding mentoring relationships."  In B.R. Ragins & K.E. Kram (Eds), The handbook of mentoring.  Thousand Oaks, CA: Sage.
Downing, R.A. Crosby, F.J. & Blake-Beard, S.D. (2005).  “The perceived importance of developmental relationships on women undergraduates’ pursuit of science.” Psychology of Women Quarterly.
Blake-Beard, S.D. & Morgan-Roberts, L.  (2004). “Releasing the double bind of visibility of minorities in the workplace.” CGO Commentaries No. 4. Boston, MA: Center for Gender in
Crosby, F.J. & Blake-Beard, S.D.  (2004). “Affirmative action: Diversity, merit and the benefit of white people.” In M. Fine, L. Weis, L. Powell and A. Burns (Eds.), Off White: Readings in Power, Privilege and Resistance, publisher, city, page numbers.
Blake-Beard, S.D.  (2003).  “Critical trends and shifts in the mentoring experiences of professional women.”  CGO Insights, No.15.   Boston, MA: Center for Gender in Organizations, Simmons School of Management.

Sources
 Simmons College School of Management
Robert Toigo Foundation
 Indian School of Business
The Network of Executive Women
Omega Institute
Blake-Beard's Business Educators Member Profile

External links

Living people
Harvard Graduate School of Education faculty
University of Michigan College of Literature, Science, and the Arts alumni
Year of birth missing (living people)
University System of Maryland alumni